The national flag of Guinea-Bissau was adopted in 1973 when independence from Portugal was proclaimed.

Gallery

Design 

Like the former flag of Cape Verde, the flag is based on that of the African Party for the Independence of Guinea and Cape Verde (PAIGC). The party was established in 1956 to peacefully campaign for independence from Portugal during its Estado Novo regime, but turned to armed conflict in the 1960s and was one of the belligerents in the 1963–74 Guinea-Bissau War of Independence. It is still the dominant party in Guinea-Bissau. The PAIGC party flag was derived from that of Ghana, which was the first design to use the Pan-African combination of red, yellow, green, and black in 1957.

In the Ghanaian view, the black star stands for the unity of Africa. Red stands for the blood shed during the struggle for independence, yellow stands for the sun, and green represents hope.

The flag features the traditional Pan-African colors of gold, green, red, and also the Black Star of Africa.  The flag's design is heavily influenced by the flag of Ghana.  The colors have the same meanings: specifically, the red is for the blood of martyrs, green for forests, and gold for mineral wealth.

Colors

References

External links

See also 

 Pan-African colors
 Flag of Texas

Flags introduced in 1973
Flags of Africa
Flag
Guinea-Bissau